The Rupt de Mad is a  long river in the Meuse and Meurthe-et-Moselle départements, northeastern France. It flows generally northeast.

Départements and communes along its course
This list is ordered from source to mouth: 
 Meuse: Geville, Broussey-Raulecourt, Bouconville-sur-Madt, Rambucourt, Xivray-et-Marvoisin, Richecourt, Lahayville 
 Meurthe-et-Moselle: Saint-Baussant, Essey-et-Maizerais, Pannes, Euvezin, Bouillonville, Thiaucourt-Regniéville, Jaulny, Rembercourt-sur-Mad, Waville, Villecey-sur-Mad, Onville, Vandelainville, Bayonville-sur-Mad, Arnaville

References

Rivers of France
Rivers of Meurthe-et-Moselle
Rivers of Meuse (department)
Rivers of Grand Est